Polyvalent Hall from Călăraşi is a multi-purpose indoor arena in Călăraşi, Romania. 

It was completed at the end of 2010 at a cost of €5 million and it was opened at the start of 2011.

The arena seats up to 1,540 for handball and around 2,540 for boxings or other events.

It is owned by the Municipality of Călăraşi.

Indoor arenas in Romania
Handball venues in Romania